From 1906 to 1926, the Finnish Swimming Federation did not arrange a dedicated national competition, but spread out the hosting duties of the championship events to multiple clubs.

Few of the championship events were held before the opening of the World War I prompted the federation to cancel them.

Diving

Men

Plain 
Competed in Helsinki on 2 August 1914.

Source:

Swimming

Men

100 metre freestyle 
Competed in Helsinki on 2 August 1914.

Source:

500 metre freestyle 
Competed in Helsinki on 2 August 1914.

Source:

100 metre backstroke 
Competed in Helsinki on 1 August 1914.

Source:

100 metre breaststroke 
Competed in Helsinki on 1 August 1914.

Source:

200 metre breaststroke 
Competed in Helsinki on 2 August 1914.

Source:

400 metre breaststroke 
Competed in Helsinki on 1 August 1914.

Source:

4 × 50 metre freestyle relay 
Competed in Helsinki on 2 August 1914.

Source:

Sources

References 

National swimming competitions
National championships in Finland
Swimming competitions in Finland
1914 in Finnish sport
1914 in water sports
Diving competitions in Finland
Water polo competitions